Dockter is a surname. Notable people with the surname include:

Jason Dockter (born 1973), American politician
Warren Dockter (born 1982), British author and historian

See also
Docker (surname)
Docter (disambiguation)

Scottish surnames